"Pennsylvania" is the regional anthem of the U.S. state of Pennsylvania.

History
The song was written and composed by Eddie Khoury and Ronnie Bonner and serves as the official state song for all public purposes. State Representative Frank L. Oliver introduced the bill for the song, and it was adopted by the General Assembly and signed into law by Governor Robert P. Casey on November 29, 1990. It replaced "Hail, Pennsylvania!".

Lyrics
Pennsylvania, Pennsylvania,
Mighty is your name,
Steeped in glory and tradition,
Object of acclaim.
Where brave men fought the foe of freedom,
Tyranny decried,
Til the bell of independence
filled the countryside.

Chorus 
Pennsylvania, Pennsylvania,
May your future be,
filled with honor everlasting
as your history.

Pennsylvania, Pennsylvania,
Blessed by God's own hand,
Birthplace of a mighty nation,
Keystone of the land.
Where first our country's flag unfolded,
Freedom to proclaim,
May the voices of tomorrow
glorify your name.

Chorus
Pennsylvania, Pennsylvania,
May your future be,
filled with honor everlasting
as your history.

External links
Pennsylvania state symbols, from the Pennsylvania Historical and Museum Commission
Lyrics, sheet music, and MIDI, on 50states.com
Performance on YouTube

Pennsylvania
Music of Pennsylvania
Symbols of Pennsylvania
Songs about Pennsylvania